Ørjan Berg Hansen (born 29 April 1984) is a Norwegian football defender who is currently the director of sports of Fram Larvik.

Hailing from Larvik, he started his career in Larvik Turn, only to go on to second-tier team Sandefjord. In 2006 he was loaned out to Kongsvinger, a loan that was made permanent after the season. The highlight was contesting the 2010 Tippeligaen. One season for HamKam in 2012 was followed by retirement due to inflammations in the knee region. He was later hired as director of sports in third-tier team Fram Larvik, playing the occasional match when the team found themselves in dire need of match-fit players.

References

1984 births
Living people
People from Larvik
Norwegian footballers
Sandefjord Fotball players
Kongsvinger IL Toppfotball players
Hamarkameratene players
Eliteserien players
Norwegian First Division players
Association football defenders
Sportspeople from Vestfold og Telemark